The Gould GR59 is an open-wheel race car, designed, developed and built by British company Gould Racing, specifically for the hillclimb events, since 2012.

References 

Open wheel racing cars